The women's 48 kg competition of the 2013 World Judo Championships was held on August 26.

Medalists

Results

Pool A

Pool B

Pool C

Pool D

Finals

Repechage

References

External links
 
 Draw

W48
World Judo Championships Women's Extra Lightweight
World W48